Oceanian records in the sport of athletics are ratified by the Oceania Athletics Association (OAA).

Outdoor

Key to tables:

+ = en route to a longer distance

h = hand timing

OT = oversized track (> 200m in circumference)

A = affected by altitude

a = aided road course according to IAAF rule 260.28

Men

Women

Mixed

Indoor

Men

Women

Notes

References
General
Oceania Records 5 December 2022 updated
Specific

External links
OAA web site
Oceanian Rankings, Records and Best Performances

records